AC Andromedae (AC And) is a variable star in the constellation Andromeda. Its maximum apparent visual magnitude is 10.77, but can be seen fainter down to a magnitude of 11.9.

AC Andromedae was first reported to be a variable star by Paul Guthnick and Richard Prager in 1927. They noted that it varied in brightness rapidly, with no discernible period.

The nature of AC Andromedae is still not determined. Its light curve shows clearly three radial pulsation modes, the fundamental one with a period of 0.71 days, and the first two overtones of 0.525 and 0.421 days, respectively. It is then unclear if it belongs to the class of RR Lyrae variables or to the one of Delta Scuti variables. Another study points at AC And as an intermediate object between classical Cepheids and Delta Scuti variables. The physical parameters of the star itself would be different depending on which class it belongs to. 

By late 2018, the AC Andromedae was classified as rare "triple-mode" subtype of the dwarf cepheid (high-amplitude Delta Scuti variable).

References

Andromeda (constellation)
Andromedae, AC
J23180234+4846582
115046
Durchmusterung objects
F-type giants